Eucalyptus lirata, commonly known as Kimberley yellowjacket, is a species of small tree or mallee that is endemic to the Kimberley region of Western Australia. It has rough, fibrous bark on the trunk and most of the branches, lance-shaped or curved adult leaves, flower buds arranged in groups of three, white flowers and cylindrical to cup-shaped fruit.

Description
It has rough, brownish, fibrous or flaky bark on the trunk and most of the branches. Flowering occurs from September to January and the flowers are white.

Taxonomy and naming
Eucalyptus lirata was first formally described in 1921 by Joseph Maiden in his book A Critical Revision of the Genus Eucalyptus. The specific epithet (liratus) is from the Latin word lira meaning "furrowed" with the ending -atus indicating possession, probably referring to the bark.

Distribution and habitat
The Kimberley leatherjacket grows on ridges, rises and plateaux as scattered trees or in woodland in the Kimberley region.

Conservation status
This eucalypt is classified as "not threatened" by the Western Australian Government Department of Parks and Wildlife.

See also

List of Eucalyptus species

References

Eucalypts of Western Australia
Trees of Australia
lirata
Myrtales of Australia
Plants described in 1921
Taxa named by Joseph Maiden